Dallas Seavey (born March 4, 1987) is an American dog musher, one of only two mushers to win the Iditarod Trail Sled Dog Race across the U.S. state of Alaska five times: in 2012, 2014, 2015, 2016, and 2021. In 2011, Seavey competed in and won the Yukon Quest sled dog race. In 2018 and 2019, Seavey also competed in Europe's longest sled dog race, Norway's Finnmarkslopet.

Seavey's grandfather, Dan Seavey, competed in the first two Iditarod sled dog races in 1973 and 1974, as well as the 1997 and 2012 races. His father, Mitch Seavey, has also competed in multiple Iditarods, winning in 2004, 2013 and 2017.

Iditarod Trail Sled Dog Race
Dallas Seavey is the youngest musher to compete in the Iditarod, beginning his first race on March 5, 2005, the day after turning 18. At the time, he ran his father's "puppy" team, a team of less-experienced dogs. He swiftly moved into the top ten by the 2009 Iditarod, and in 2012 became the youngest musher to win the Iditarod at age 25, with a finishing time of 9 days, 4 hours, 29 minutes, 26 seconds.

In 2014, Dallas Seavey won his second Iditarod, completing the race less than two minutes ahead of second-place finisher Aliy Zirkle, with a record finish time of 8 days, 13 hours, 4 minutes, 19 seconds. Seavey's 2014 finish time broke the previous record of 2011 winner John Baker by more than five hours.

In 2015, Seavey won the Iditarod for a third time, in a race held from Fairbanks to Nome, with the official start moved due to a lack of snow in Southcentral Alaska.

In 2016, Dallas Seavey won the Iditarod for a fourth time, this time breaking his own record time. His time was 8 days, 11 hours, 20 minutes, and 16 seconds.

In 2017, Dallas's record time was broken by his father, Mitch Seavey. Mitch Seavey's time was 8 days, 3 hours, 40 minutes, 13 seconds. Dallas came in second place.

After the 2017 race, four of Seavey's dogs tested positive for a banned substance. Seavey denied any knowledge or involvement, speculating a rival had attempted to get him disqualified, and was ultimately cleared by the Iditarod Trail Committee. As a result, Seavey took a three-year break from the Iditarod. In 2018, the race also implemented more stringent measures to prevent tampering with dogs' food by sealing food drop bags with tamper-proof zipties and adding 24/7 surveillance to the Nome dog lot and three other checkpoints along the route.

In 2021, Seavey returned to the Iditarod, racing with a combined team of his father's dogs and his own, after Mitch Seavey announced he would sit out the race. Seavey won the slightly shortened 2021 Iditarod in 7 days, 14 hours, 8 minutes, and 57 seconds, capturing his fifth championship and matching Rick Swenson for most Iditarod wins.

Yukon Quest
Dallas Seavey placed first in the 1,000 mile race between White Horse, Yukon and Fairbanks, Alaska in 2011.  He finished with a time of 10 days, 11 hours, 53 minutes.

Finnmarksløpet
Dallas Seavey placed third in the 1,200-km Finnmarksløpet in Norway in 2018, his first time competing in that event. He scratched in 2019, citing his dogs' health. He was registered to race in the 2020 Finnmarksløpet, but the race was cancelled due to COVID-19.

References

External links 
 Dallas Seavey's Official Website
 Dallas Seavey on National Geographic Ultimate Survivor Alaska
 Dallas Seavey's Autobiography

1987 births
Dog mushers from Alaska
Living people
Participants in American reality television series
People from Matanuska-Susitna Borough, Alaska
Reality show winners
Iditarod champions